Kevin Hoffmann (born 6 June 1995) is a German professional footballer who plays as a forward for Bayernliga club SV Donaustauf.

For the 2018–19 season, he was loaned out to FSV Zwickau. The season after, he was loaned out again, this time to VfR Aalen.

References

External links
 

1995 births
21st-century German people
Sportspeople from Regensburg
Footballers from Bavaria
Living people
German footballers
Association football forwards
SpVgg Greuther Fürth II players
SSV Jahn Regensburg players
SSV Jahn Regensburg II players
FSV Zwickau players
VfR Aalen players
Regionalliga players
Bayernliga players
3. Liga players
Landesliga players